Jérôme Chiotti (born 18 January 1972 in Millau, France) was a professional racing cyclist in both road and mountain bike disciplines.  He is most renowned for his victory in the 1996 World Mountain Bike Championships, a title which he later renounced by admitting doping.

Doping Admission
Chiotti admitted to doping in order to win the 1996 World Champsionships in an interview with French magazine Vélo Vert on 23 April 2000.
He admitted to spending up to US$6000 per year for EPO.  He consequently  renounced his World title during a press conference in Paris on 25 May 2000.

The official UCI results were amended to reflect Thomas Frischknecht as the winner of the 1996 World Champion title.

References

People from Millau
1972 births
French male cyclists
Living people
Cross-country mountain bikers
Sportspeople from Aveyron
Cyclists from Occitania (administrative region)